Suyt'uqucha (Quechua suyt'u, sayt'u rectangular, qucha lake, lagoon, "rectangular lake", Hispanicized spelling Suytococha) is a lake in Peru located in the Puno Region, Melgar Province, Santa Rosa District. Suyt'uqucha lies west of Khunurana and south of the street and rails which go through the La Raya pass.

See also
 Janq'uquta
List of lakes in Peru

References

Lakes of Peru
Lakes of Puno Region